Internet Party  may refer to:

 Internet Party (Spain)
 Internet Party (New Zealand)
 Internet Party (Ukraine)
 Internet Party (United States)